Hearts and Fists is a 1926 American silent drama film directed by Lloyd Ingraham and starring John Bowers, Marguerite De La Motte, and Alan Hale.

Plot
As described in a film magazine review, Larry Pond, a young man whose father dies and leaves him a failing lumbering business, falls in love with Alexia Newton, the fiancé of his crooked business rival. His rival attempts to ruin his plant. His blocking the attempt proves to the young woman which is the better man, and an unusual marriage ceremony follows.

Cast

References

Bibliography
 Munden, Kenneth White. The American Film Institute Catalog of Motion Pictures Produced in the United States, Part 1. University of California Press, 1997.

External links

1926 films
1926 drama films
Silent American drama films
Films directed by Lloyd Ingraham
American silent feature films
1920s English-language films
American black-and-white films
Associated Exhibitors films
1920s American films